Metus may refer to:

 Metus (fungus), lichenized fungi in the family Cladoniaceae
 Metus or Deimos (deity), the personification of terror in Roman and Greek mythology